The Jackson Sisters (not to be confused with the Cincinnati Jackson Sisters, nor the siblings to American soul group The Jackson Five) were an American soul and disco family group in the 1970s, formed in 1971. The group hailed from Compton, California but were based in Detroit, Michigan.

History
The Jackson Sisters were Jacqueline Jackson-Rencher, Lyn Jackson, Pat Jackson, Rae Jackson and Gennie Jackson. They recorded material for the Tiger Lily Records label, obtaining some modest success in the 1970s. However the group really came into their own nearly a decade later, following the emergence of the rare groove scene in the UK. Many of their songs were written by Johnny Bristol. "I Believe in Miracles", their hit song, was written and originally recorded by Mark Capanni in 1973. The track reached #72 in the UK Singles Chart in June 1987.

Discography

Albums
Jackson Sisters (1976)

Singles

References

External links
 

1977 disestablishments in Michigan
1971 establishments in Michigan
American disco groups
American funk musical groups
American girl groups
American rhythm and blues musical groups
American soul musical groups
Family musical groups
Musical groups disestablished in 1977
Musical groups established in 1971
Musical quintets